San Miguel Arcángel Fountain is installed in Cholula, Puebla's Plaza de la Concordia, in Mexico. The fountain was gifted by Philip II of Spain in 1554.

References

External links

 

1550s establishments in Mexico
1550s sculptures
Fountains in Mexico
Michael (archangel)
Outdoor sculptures in Cholula, Puebla
Statues in Puebla